Carl Mikael Augustinus ”Mika” Tiivola (30 November 1922 – 13 April 1994) was a Finnish businessman. He was the former CEO of the former Finnish bank Union Bank of Finland (or SYP). He was the Chairman of Nokia Corporation when SYP was its largest owner in the 1980s.

References
  Nokian pelastajat lähtivät Taloussanomat.fi (1998-03-25)

1922 births
1994 deaths
20th-century Finnish businesspeople
Nokia people
Finnish bankers